The Bagaduce class was a class of United States Navy fleet tugs.  The first ship of the class,  was laid down on 16 July 1918 at Buffalo, New York, by the Ferguson Steel and Iron Company.  She was briefly named Ammonoosuc in February 1919, renamed Bagaduce on 24 February 1919, launched 5 April 1919, and commissioned at Buffalo on 18 September 1919.  The Bagaduce was constructed as part of the World War I shipbuilding program, and was the first of 19 new steel tugs designed to serve as minesweepers and conduct heavy-duty towing work at navy yards.

Ships

See also
 Sotoyomo-class fleet tug
 Type V ship - Tugs
 List of auxiliaries of the United States Navy

References

Bagaduce-class fleet tugs
Auxiliary ship classes of the United States Navy
Auxiliary tugboat classes